Pasolini, un delitto italiano (Pasolini, an Italian Crime), internationally released as Who Killed Pasolini?, is a 1995 Italian crime-drama film co-written and directed by Marco Tullio Giordana. It was released on 3 July 1996. It depicts the trial against Pino Pelosi, who was charged with the murder of artist and filmmaker Pier Paolo Pasolini.

The film entered the competition at the 52nd Venice International Film Festival, in which Giordana won the President of the Italian Senate's gold medal. The film also won the David di Donatello for best editing.

Plot synopsis 
The film traces the last hours of the life of poet and film director Pier Paolo Pasolini. The poet is killed at night in 1975 on the beach at Ostia, near Rome. A boy is arrested: Pino Pelosi, and charged with murder. The police and judges believe that Pelosi is the only murderer of Pasolini, but his injuries on the body of the poet are too severe and profound. Then are called to bear witness to the death of the poet his sister and his mother, destroyed by grief.

As the process unfolds, the film examines the personality of Pasolini, his body of work and, above all, explains what people think of him in Italy: Pasolini according to some Italians was a provocative man who "deserved what he suffered" (his murder), as punishment for been a Communist and a homosexual. Instead, his friends and fellow intellectuals remember him as a very good and sensible man, who sought only to fight against neo-fascism and the cruel and bigoted mentality prevailing in the Occidental world, particularly in the bourgeois and middle-class society.

Cast 
Carlo De Filippi: Pino Pelosi
Giulio Scarpati: Nino Marazzita
Antonello Fassari: Rocco Mangia
Claudio Bigagli: Guido Calvi
Andrea Occhipinti: Furio Colombo
Nicoletta Braschi: Graziella Chiarcossi
Massimo De Francovich: Faustino Durante 
Victor Cavallo: Antonio Pelosi 
Rosa Pianeta: Maria Pelosi
Antonio Petrocelli: Tommaso Spaltro
Ivano Marescotti: a customer of Spaltro
Claudio Amendola: "Trepalle"
Enzo Marcelli: Braciola
Simone Melis: Bracioletta
Adriana Asti: teacher 
Toni Bertorelli: inspector Pigna
Francesco Siciliano: journalist
Pier Paolo Pasolini (archival footage)
Ninetto Davoli (archival footage)

References

External links

Who Killed Pasolini? at Variety Distribution

1995 films
1995 crime drama films
Italian crime drama films
Italian LGBT-related films
Films directed by Marco Tullio Giordana
Films scored by Ennio Morricone
Italian films based on actual events
Courtroom films
1990s legal films
Pier Paolo Pasolini
1990s Italian-language films
1990s Italian films
Cultural depictions of Italian men